Walton and Ivythorn Hills is a  biological Site of Special Scientific Interest near Street at the south-eastern end of the Polden Hills in the English county of Somerset. Walton Hill is south of the village of Walton, and Ivythorn Hill is south of Street. Notified in 1953, the site is now owned and managed by the National Trust who acquired the freehold in 1988.

A quarry existed in the Middle Ages. This supports a variety of Butterflies, Leafhoppers, Spiders, Soldier Flies and Great Green Bush Crickets living on the vegetation. Notable buildings include Ivythorne Manor, which was originally built for Glastonbury Abbey, Walton windmill and a small sanatorium which became the first youth hostel in Somerset. In 1977 a short lived hippie camp was set up on Ivythorne Hill. The camp was a Free Festival to celebrate  7/7/77. The festival was attended by an estimated 3,000 people and was basically a one-day affair, with some people arriving early and the hangers on eventually evicted by the council.

Geography
The ridge is underlain by Blue Lias with alternating strata of limestone, rheatic clay and Keuper marl.

History

A quarry on Ivythorn Hill produced stone for Street Manor in 1403. Ivythorne Manor is a Grade II* listed building which was built as a monastic dwelling in the medieval era and rebuilt in 1488 by John Selwood, Abbot of Glastonbury Abbey. It later became a country house and was revised and extended from the 16th to 20th centuries by the Marshall and Sydenham families which owned it. Within the grounds is a dovecote which was probably built around 1578 for John Sydenham.

Walton windmill on Walton Hill was described as "new-erected" in 1741, although there had been a mill erected on the site in 1342. It was worked until 1906. It is now a Grade II listed building and private residence. There was also a windmill on Ivythorne Hill.

The shoe manufacturer C. & J. Clark, through the Society of Friends, had a small sanatorium and convalescent home on Ivythorn Hill overlooking Street. In 1931, this chalet style building was leased to the Youth Hostel Association and became the first youth hostel in Somerset. It is still used for this purpose.

This site is owned and managed by the National Trust.

In 1977 Ivythorne Hill was the site of a hippie camp following summer solstice celebrations at Stonehenge. They were evicted by Mendip District Council.

Ecology

Walton and Ivythorn Hills are covered by a variety of semi-natural habitats. These include unimproved calcareous grassland, scrubland and coppiced woodland including field maple and Ash. The range of habitats are home to many species of invertebrate. Butterflies, Leafhoppers, Spiders and Soldier Flies are particularly well represented. There is also a population of Great Green Bush Cricket (Tettigonia viridissima).

Between 2011 and 2013 a project was undertaken to increase the population of Large blue butterflies on the Polden Hills. This included planting Wild Thyme and managing the grazing on Walton Hill.

References

Sites of Special Scientific Interest in Somerset
Hills of Somerset
National Trust properties in Somerset
Sites of Special Scientific Interest notified in 1953